Guadix Club de Fútbol is a Spanish football team based in Guadix, in the autonomous community of Andalusia. It plays in Primera Andaluza, holding home matches at Estadio Municipal de Guadix, which holds a capacity of 3,000 people.

History
Founded in 1954, after a previous Guadix CF was already dissolved in the city, the club initially only lasted six seasons active. In 1962, UD Accitana was founded, but folded two years later. In 1969, Club Amigos del Deporte was created, later adopting the name Guadix CF.

After years floating between the lower divisions, Guadix club came to national recognition during the 2000–01 Copa del Rey, after knocking out Valencia CF in the round of 32 on penalties; in the following round, however, it was eliminated by Granada CF also from the spot.

In 2005, Guadix sold his spot in the Tercera División to Granada Atlético CF, whilst at the same time AD Íllora (from Íllora) was named Guadix CD. In 2008, Guadix CD was renamed to the actual Guadix CF, inheriting the old club's history.

Club background
Guadix Club de Fútbol - (1954–1960)
Unión Deportiva Accitana - (1962–1964)
Guadix Club de Fútbol - (1969–2005)
Club Amigos del Deporte - (1969–1971)
Guadix Club de Fútbol - (1971–2005)
Granada Atlético Club de Fútbol - (2005–2009)
Guadix Club de Fútbol - (1995–)
Íllora Club Deportivo - (1995–2005)
Guadix Club Deportivo - (2005–2008)
Guadix Club de Fútbol - (2008–)

Season to season

Guadix CF (1954)

4 seasons in Tercera División

Guadix CF (1969)

4 seasons in Segunda División B
14 seasons in Tercera División

Guadix CF (1995)

5 seasons in Tercera División

References

External links
Guadix CF (I) - ArefePedia team profile 
Guadix CF - ArefePedia team profile 
BDFutbol team profile
La Preferente team profile 
Soccerway team profile

Football clubs in Andalusia
Association football clubs established in 1954
Association football clubs established in 1969
Association football clubs established in 1995
1954 establishments in Spain
1969 establishments in Spain
1995 establishments in Spain